The 2019 DTM Nürburg round was a motor racing event for the Deutsche Tourenwagen Masters held between 14 and 15 September 2019. The event, part of the 33rd season of the DTM, was held at the Nürburgring in Germany.

René Rast secured his second drivers' championship following his third-place finish in the second race, with his closest rival Nico Müller exactly an event's worth of points behind. Given that Rast had an insurmountable number of wins, even if Müller had managed to close the gap he would still have lost the title on a count-back.

Results

Race 1

Qualifying

 – Car #21 received a three-place grid penalty.

Race

Race 2

Qualifying

Race

Championship standings

Drivers Championship

Teams Championship

Manufacturers Championship

 Note: Only the top five positions are included for three sets of standings.

References

External links
Official website

|- style="text-align:center"
|width="35%"|Previous race:
|width="30%"|Deutsche Tourenwagen Masters2019 season
|width="40%"|Next race:

Nürburg DTM
DTM Nürburg